, also romanised as Akiko Ohku, is a Japanese film director.

Ōku was born in Yokohama, Kanagawa. In high school, she joined a rakugo group. While studying Politics and Economics at Meiji University, she was part of a student theatre troupe. After graduating, Ōku briefly had an office job at a subsidiary of the Ministry of Labour. She then entered a comedy acting school for one year and performed as stand-up comedian, and afterwards, at age 27, she entered Eigabi School, a film school where director Kiyoshi Kurosawa taught, among others.

Igaito shinanai
While still at film school, Ōku won a screenwriting contest with a script that would become her theatrical feature film debut as director,  (Igaito shinanai, literally "don't die unexpectedly"). The film was released in 1999. It is about an elementary school teacher troubled by pupils, parents, colleagues and a stalker.

Lost After School
Lost After School (original title  Hōkago rosuto) is an anthology film released in 2014 consisting of three episodes about high school girls. The film is based on the shōjo manga World Gaze Clips by Ran Igarashi. Each episode was directed by a different female director, the other directors besides Ōku being Chihiro Amano and Ai Nagura. Ōku's segment is titled  (baion, literally "overtones").

Fantastic Girls
Fantastic Girls (original title  Dērē gāruzu) was released in 2015. It is adapted from the novel of the same title by Maha Harada. The word dērē in the title is Okayama dialect and means "very". The story is about two high-school friends in 1980 who reunite 30 years later.

Tremble All You Want

 (Katte ni furuetero) is a romantic comedy released in 2017. It won the Audience Award at the 30th Tokyo International Film Festival, and its leading actress Mayu Matsuoka was nominated for a Japan Academy Film Prize.

Later films
Further films by Ōku include  Bijin ga konkatsu shite mitara / Marriage Hunting Beauty (2019, based on the manga by Arako Toaru) and  Watashi wo kuitomete / Hold Me Back (2020, based on the novel by Risa Wataya).

References

External links
 

1968 births
Living people
Japanese women film directors
Japanese women screenwriters